Comikaza is the first brick and mortar comic book store in Israel. In 2016 it was nominated for the Will Eisner Spirit of Comics Retailer Award.

History 
The first branch of Comikaza opened on September 15, 2003, in Ramat Aviv neighborhood of Tel Aviv by Yossi and Ofra Konijn, a married couple. Prior to the establishment of a brick and mortar store, they operated an online forum and retailer under the domain name comics-net.com. When they realized there was demand, the idea of opening a physical store started taking shape.

In 2005 the store relocated from Ramat Aviv to the Dizengoff Center mall in the center of Tel Aviv. Shortly thereafter, an additional store was opened in the mall named "Otaku" specializing in the sale of Japanese Manga, Anime and related paraphernalia. In 2013 the store temporarily shut down and was acquired by Jackob Sareli and Ori Ayalon, former customers, who have operated the store ever since under the branding Comikaza 2.0.

In 2016 the store was nominated for the Will Eisner Spirit of Comics Retailer Award.

The store held signing events with comics creators Neil Gaiman in 2006 and Chip Zdarsky in 2016. Every May it celebrates Free Comic Book Day (FCBD), giving away free comic books for a period of six hours. FCBD is usually held on Fridays in Israel rather than the usual Saturday due to the Shabbath. In 2014 and 2019 the store was nominated for The Diamond Retailer Best Practices Awards for its work on FCBD. The store hosts a comic book reading book club among its customers and has hosted several geek-culture related trivia, auctions, and standup comedy nights.

On 5 August 2004, the store announced the release of the official Marvel-sanctioned Hebrew translation of Ultimate Spider-Man by Brian Michael Bendis and Mark Bagley, translated by David Chanoch published under the label "Comikaza Press". Comikaza released a total of 7 issues in Hebrew, collecting the first story arc of the title. The purpose of producing a Hebrew translation for Spider-Man was: "To promote the Israeli comics industry. Our intention is to ensure that many children, who to this day have been reluctant to read comics due to language barriers, will be able to access the book without fear and as a result will begin to express interest in other comics as well. Our hope is that in a few years there will be a greater number of titles here - original and translated - and we will be able to reach the level of European countries, with a local-language comics section in every bookstore."

In 2018 a Haifa branch was opened, managed by local comics artist Vladik Sandler. This branch shut down at the end of 2019.

References

External links 

 
 
 

Culture in Tel Aviv
Bookstores in Israel
Israeli comics
Comics
Comics retailers